Djämes Braun is a Danish reggae and dancehall act made up of Pilfinger (full name Lasse "Pilfinger" Kramhøft) and former member Kenno (full name Kent "Kenno" Pedersen). 

They became known in 2012 mostly through their appearance on the musical talent show KarriereKanonen broadcast on Danish radio station DR P3. Their debut single was Duft af ba-cone followed by Kom og giv mig alle dine penge.

The name Djämes Braun is an alternative way of writing James Brown.

In late 2017 Kenno left the act. Djämes Braun is still active as a solo project by Pilfinger.

Discography

Albums

Singles

Featured in

References

Danish musical duos